The Battle of Jutas was fought on Tuesday, 13 September 1808 between Swedish and Russian troops south of Nykarleby in Ostrobothnia, Finland. Before the battle the Swedish army was in retreat after the campaign of the previous summer. The main Swedish force was retreating from Vaasa to Nykarleby. The Russians sent a force to cut off the Swedish retreat. In response the Swedes sent a force under Georg Carl von Döbeln to intercept them. The battle ended in a Swedish victory, but the main Swedish army was beaten in the Battle of Oravais the very next day.

The battle is described in Johan Ludvig Runeberg's epic poem Döbeln at Jutas.

References

Bibliography

Jutas
Jutas 1808
Jutas
Nykarleby
Jutas
Jutas
History of Ostrobothnia (region)
September 1808 events